Eina Station is located in Eina in Vestre Toten, Norway. The station is located on the Gjøvik Line, in addition to being the terminus of the now abandoned Valdres Line. It was opened on 23 December 1901 with the opening of the North Line (now Gjøvik Line).

The station is served by local trains to Oslo Central Station and Gjøvik Station by Vy Gjøvikbanen.

External links 
  Entry at Jernbaneverket <
 Entry at the Norwegian Railway Club 

Railway stations in Oppland
Railway stations on the Gjøvik Line
Railway stations on the Valdres Line
Railway stations opened in 1901
1901 establishments in Norway
Vestre Toten